Gostków may refer to the following places in Poland:
Gostków, Lower Silesian Voivodeship (south-west Poland)
Gostków, Świętokrzyskie Voivodeship (south-central Poland)
Nowy Gostków, a village in Gmina Wartkowice, Poddębice County, Łódź Voivodeship
Stary Gostków, a village in Gmina Wartkowice, Poddębice County, Łódź Voivodeship